Roger David Marquis, 2nd Earl of Woolton (16 July 1922 – 7 January 1969), was the son of the 1st Earl of Woolton. His first wife was The Hon. Lucia Edith Lawson, the daughter of Edward Lawson, 4th Baron Burnham. They were divorced in 1953, having had no issue together. In 1957 he married (Cecily) Josephine Gordon-Cumming (born  11 December 1925), the elder daughter of Major Sir Alexander Penrose Gordon-Cumming, 5th Baronet.

The second Lady Woolton bore him two children:
Simon Marquis, 3rd Earl of Woolton (24 May 1958)
 Lady Alexandra Susan Marquis (12 January 1961)

After his death, Lady Woolton married secondly on 22 September 1969  the 3rd Baron Forres, but was divorced in 1974.  She married thirdly in 1982 (as his second wife) the 3rd Earl Lloyd George (1924–2010).

Arms

References

Woolton, Roger Marquis, 2nd Earl of
Woolton, Roger Marquis, 2nd Earl of
Woolton, Roger David Marquis, 2nd Earl of